Kanyini is a 2006 Australian documentary film, created by Uncle Bob Randall. His dream was to create a film that supported his Kanyini teachings. He approached Melanie Hogan to produce it with him. She directed, filmed and edited the film with the help of Martin Lee whose filming of Uncle Bob Randall's interview made the core thread of the story. The film explores the Kanyini philosophy and the life of Bob Randall, Aboriginal elder, songman and storyteller who lived in Mutitjulu, a town beside the world's greatest monolith, Uluru, in Central Australia. Bob Randall was a 'Tjilpi' (special teaching uncle) of the Yankunytjatjara people and a member of the Stolen Generations.

Overview
In Kanyini, Bob Randall [cc1933-2015] shares his knowledge of Anangu wisdom, stories of his personal journey and he explores some of the reasons behind the struggles of Aboriginal Australians in modern Australia. Randall explains that when European Australians came to Australia, they broke the four Kanyini Principles that were an integral part of Anangu life. Tjuukurpa was broken when Europeans imposed their law on the Anangu, Ngura was broken when Aboriginal people were forced to move away from their traditional lands, Walytja was broken when the children of Randall's generation were removed from their family as part of the Stolen Generations and Kurunpa was broken when Aboriginal spirituality was replaced with Christianity. In explaining the loss of his Kurunpa, Randall notes the disconnect between the teachings of the Bible and the actions of the white men who professed them.

Kanyini Principles
Kanyini is a Pitjantjatjara word meaning interconnectedness; caring, support, nurturing, and responsibility.

The four principles of Kanyini are:

Ngura
A sense of belonging to home and land.

Walytja
Family connecting with life.

Kurunpa
Love, spirit or soul.

Tjuukurpa
The belief about creation and the right way to live.

Awards

See also
Kanyini

References

External links
Melanie Hogan Official Site
Official Site
The Yarnup program
ABC At the Movies review
ninemsn Sunday review
Sydney Film Festival Interview with Melanie Hogan

2006 films
2006 documentary films
Films set in the Northern Territory
Australian documentary films
Documentary films about Aboriginal Australians
Stolen Generations
2000s English-language films